Tiago Felipe Santos da Silva  (born March 28, 1985) is a Brazilian-Italian professional baseball pitcher with the Generales de Durango of the Mexican League. From 2008 to 2013 he played with the San Marino Baseball Club of the Italian Baseball League (IBL), posting a 41–12 win–loss record, a 2.00 earned run average, and 490 strikeouts.

Career

Macoto Cobras
On October 3, 2004, da Silva made his professional debut with the Macoto Cobras of the Chinese Professional Baseball League. He became a free agent following the season.

T&A San Marino
After not playing affiliated ball since 2004, da Silva joined the T&A San Marino of the Italian Baseball League for the 2008 season. He played with the club in 2009, 2010, 2011, 2012, and 2013. He became a free agent after the 2013 season.

Delfines de Ciudad del Carmen
On April 1, 2014, da Silva was assigned to the Delfines de Ciudad del Carmen of the Mexican League. He was released by the team on December 31, 2014.

Toronto Blue Jays
On January 31, 2015, da Silva signed a minor league contract with the Toronto Blue Jays of Major League Baseball (MLB). He opened the season with the Advanced-A Dunedin Blue Jays, and was promoted to the Double-A New Hampshire Fisher Cats on May 2, 2015.

Second stint with Delfines de Ciudad del Carmen
On May 14, he was loaned to the Delfines de Ciudad del Carmen. da Silva was released by the Blue Jays organization in November 2015. da Silva played for the Delfines during the 2016 season as well.

Rieleros de Aguascalientes
On June 24, 2016, da Silva was traded to the Rieleros de Aguascalientes. He finished the 2016 season with the Rieleros.

Generales de Durango
On October 3, 2016, da Silva was traded to the Delfines de Ciudad del Carmen. The Delfines folded after the 2016 season, moving locations to become the Generales de Durango. da Silva has played for the Generales through the 2019 season. He did not play in a game in 2020 due to the cancellation of the Mexican League season because of the COVID-19 pandemic.

International career
He was selected for Brazil national baseball team at the 2019 Pan American Games Qualifier and 2021 World Baseball Classic Qualifier.

And also, Da Silva was a member of the Italy national baseball team at the 2008 European Baseball Cup, 2009 European Baseball Cup, 2009 World Baseball Classic and 2013 World Baseball Classic. He played the 2014 season with the Delfines del Carmen of the Mexican Baseball League and posted a record of 7–4, a 2.07 ERA, and 29 saves.

References

External links

CPBL

1985 births
Living people
Brazilian expatriate baseball players in Mexico
Brazilian expatriate baseball players in Taiwan
Brazilian expatriate baseball players in the United States
Brazilian people of Italian descent
Cardenales de Lara players
Delfines de Ciudad del Carmen players
Dunedin Blue Jays players
Expatriate baseball players in San Marino
Generales de Durango players
Italian expatriate baseball players in Mexico
Italian expatriate baseball players in Taiwan
Italian expatriate baseball players in the United States
Leones del Caracas players
Brazilian expatriate baseball players in Venezuela
Macoto Cobras players
Mexican League baseball pitchers
New Hampshire Fisher Cats players
Rieleros de Aguascalientes players
Sportspeople from São Paulo
T & A San Marino players
2009 World Baseball Classic players
2013 World Baseball Classic players
2016 European Baseball Championship players
2017 World Baseball Classic players